Inna Volodymyrivna Logutenkova (born 19 October 1986, Donetsk, Ukrainian SSR, Soviet Union) is a Ukrainian Olympic dressage rider. She represented Ukraine at the 2016 Summer Olympics in Rio de Janeiro, Brazil, where she placed 41st in the individual competition. Logutenkova also competed at the 2020 Summer Olympics in Tokyo where she finished 47th in the individual competition.

She also participated at two World Equestrian Games (in 2014 and 2018) and three European Dressage Championships (in 2013, 2015 and 2017). Her current best championship result is 15th place with the Ukrainian team in team dressage at the 2017 Europeans. Meanwhile, her best individual result is 42nd place from the 2015 Europeans.

Logutenkova competed at the 2013 edition of the Dressage World Cup finals.

References

Living people
1986 births
Ukrainian female equestrians
Ukrainian dressage riders
Equestrians at the 2016 Summer Olympics
Equestrians at the 2020 Summer Olympics
Olympic equestrians of Ukraine
Sportspeople from Donetsk